Timothy John Watters (born July 25, 1959) is a Canadian former ice hockey defenceman.

Tim Watters was a rarity in the National Hockey League (NHL), a physical defenceman who stood under 6 feet tall and under 200 pounds. He played in 2 Olympics and well over 700 NHL games, quietly playing a solid though unspectacular role from 1981 through 1995 with the Winnipeg Jets and Los Angeles Kings, two teams that didn't enjoy much success or fanfare. Not having the size to out-muscle opponents, Watters learned to be in perfect position and angled shooters out of harm's way. He read the oncoming rushes very well, and thanklessly cut off passing lanes and blocked shots. He learned to tie up players' sticks and was one of the few modern players to master the hip check.

He retired from the NHL as a player after the 1995 season. He served as an assistant coach for the Boston Bruins during the 1996 season, and as head coach for the NCAA Division I Michigan Tech Huskies from  1996–97 to 1999–2000.

Watters currently resides in Phoenix, Arizona, where he works in the commercial real estate business.  He also coaches youth hockey in nearby Tempe.

Career statistics

Regular season and playoffs

International

Head coaching record

† Watters was fired in November and replaced by Mike Sertich

Awards and honours

References

External links
 

1959 births
Living people
Boston Bruins coaches
Canadian ice hockey coaches
Canadian ice hockey defencemen
Ice hockey people from British Columbia
Ice hockey players at the 1980 Winter Olympics
Ice hockey players at the 1988 Winter Olympics
Kamloops Braves players
Kamloops Chiefs players
Los Angeles Kings players
Merritt Centennials players
Michigan Tech Huskies men's ice hockey coaches
Michigan Tech Huskies men's ice hockey players
Olympic ice hockey players of Canada
People from Kamloops
Phoenix Roadrunners (IHL) players
Tulsa Oilers (1964–1984) players
Winnipeg Jets (1979–1996) draft picks
Winnipeg Jets (1979–1996) players
AHCA Division I men's ice hockey All-Americans